ABBAmania is a tribute album to Swedish disco-pop band ABBA, released in 1999. It followed an ITV programme of the same name and featured various British and Irish artists covering ABBA songs, except for "I Know Him So Well", which originated from the musical Chess, though it was written by ABBA songwriters Benny Andersson and Björn Ulvaeus.

Track listing
 "Money, Money, Money" – Madness
 "Lay All Your Love on Me" – Steps
 "I Have a Dream" – Westlife
 "Chiquitita" – Stephen Gately
 "Gimme! Gimme! Gimme! (A Man After Midnight)" – Denise van Outen
 "Voulez Vous" – Culture Club
 "Mamma Mia" – Martine McCutcheon
 "Dancing Queen" – S Club 7
 "I Know Him So Well" – Steps
 "Does Your Mother Know" – B*Witched
 "The Winner Takes It All" – The Corrs
 "Thank ABBA for the Music" – Steps, Tina Cousins, Cleopatra, B*Witched, Billie (Brit Awards performance)

References

See also
List of ABBA tribute albums

1999 compilation albums
ABBA tribute albums
Polydor Records compilation albums
Pop compilation albums
Madness (band)